Joshua Yuan is a scientist and engineer in sustainable technology development. He is the Chair and the Lucy & Stanley Lopata Professor in the Department of Energy, Environmental, and Chemical Engineering in the McKelvey School of Engineering at Washington University in St. Louis. Previously, he was a faculty member at Texas A&M University since 2008, served as the Director for the Synthetic and Systems Biology Innovation Hub since 2015, and was appointed as the Chair for Synthetic Biology and Renewable Products in 2018.

Early life and education
Yuan completed his Bachelor of Science degree in biology from Fudan University in 1997 before moving to the United States for his graduate degrees. He then completed his Master of Science degree in plant sciences from the University of Arizona in 2001 and his PhD in Plants, Insects, and Soils with a Focus on Functional Genomics from the University of Tennessee in 2007. Yuan minored in International Economics for his undergraduate study and statistics in his Ph.D. study.

Career
Yuan’s Ph.D. thesis was co-advised by Dr. Feng Chen and Dr. C. Neal Stewart, focusing on plant secondary metabolites known as terpenes. He has shown broad interest in research even as a Ph.D. student, where he developed a set of broadly applied statistical methods for QPCR analysis.  Upon completing his Ph.D., Yuan was supported by the SunGrant Fellowship to be trained by the National Renewable Energy Lab and the University of Tennessee for biomass processing and characterization. Yuan became an assistant professor at Texas A&M University from 2008 to 2013.  In this role, he began to develop new technologies for sustainability, renewable fuels and materials  

In 2012, he led a team of scientists and engineers to develop new routes and synthetic organelles for diverting photosynthesis carbon to squalene, a terpene product.  The technologies were later licensed and commercialized by SynShark LLC. He later continued to engineer cyanobacteria, known as blue algae, to produce another terpene, limonene.  The work eventually led to developing a type of algae that can auto-sediment, allowing the low-cost harvest.  He combined this harvesting technology with artificial intelligence to set a new world record for producing algae as a reliable, economic source for biofuel and bioproduct. The work also empowers algae to be better used for carbon capture and utilization.  Recently, he co-developed with Dr. Susie Dai a technology to integrate electrocatalysis and microorganism conversion to produce bioplastics from carbon dioxide, at a much higher efficiency than natural photosynthesis routes.

Furthermore, his laboratory pursued a decade-long effort to define the structure-function relationship of lignin chemistry and its processing and products. In 2013, his laboratory then began using the microorganisms in the Rhodococcus genus in order to turn lignin into lipids, or fats, which can be used to produce biodiesel. Yuan later focused on converting lignin to plastics while also developing procedures to fractionate lignin for bioconversion. The work eventually led to the development of new biorefinery procedures to use both carbohydrate and lignin efficiently, and lower the bioplastics cost from lignin. Yuan’s team also revealed that lignin chemical features such as molecular weight, uniformity, linkage, and functional groups could all impact lignin carbon fiber properties. The discoveries eventually guide the design of a new type of lignin to substantially improve carbon fiber properties and enable new plastic applications. As a result of his pioneering efforts of lignin conversion and photosynthetic hydrocarbon production, Yuan was recognized with a 2017 Innovation Award from Texas A&M Technology Commercialization. 

In March 2022, Yuan left Texas A&M to become chair of the Department of Energy, Environmental & Chemical Engineering in the McKelvey School of Engineering at Washington University in St. Louis. Later that year, he co-developed a novel bioremediation technology for cleaning up per- and polyfluoroalkyl substances chemical pollutants. Yuan became a Fellow of Royal Society of Chemistry in 2022.

References

External links

Living people
Place of birth missing (living people)
Date of birth missing (living people)
21st-century Chinese scientists
Chinese emigrants to the United States
University of Tennessee alumni
University of Arizona alumni
Fudan University alumni
Texas A&M University faculty
Washington University in St. Louis faculty
American phytopathologists